Smile is a 2005 drama film written and directed by Jeffrey Kramer.

Plot
Katie and Lin are born on the same day but into difference lifestyles: one in Malibu, California to a nuclear family that has to learn how to handle a growing teenager and the other into a single parent family with a teenager who was born with a facial deformity and suffers in isolationism.

Katie learns of a program, "Doctor's Gift", that provide world-wide, medical assistance to those in need. She learns about Lin.

Katie joins the program on one of its trips to China. Katie undergoes an attitude change while in China and on her own embarks to find Lin.

Lin's father, Daniel, brings Katie and Lin together. Lin is convinced to undergo surgery for her facial deformity. She is able to smile.

They both develop beyond the insularity of their particular world.

Cast
 Mika Boorem as Katie
 Wang Luoyong as Daniel
 Beau Bridges as Steven
 Cheri Oteri as Linda
 Linda Hamilton as Bridget
 Shuai Chi as  Calvin
 Jia Song as Daniel's wife
 Jonathan Trent as Ted
 Erik von Detten as Chris
 Yi Ding as Lin
 Sean Astin as Mr. Matthews

References

External links
 
 

2005 films
2005 directorial debut films
2005 drama films
2000s English-language films
2000s Mandarin-language films
American adventure drama films
Films shot in China
2000s American films